The 1956 United States presidential election in California took place on November 1956 as part of the 1956 United States presidential election. State voters chose 32 representatives, or electors, to the Electoral College, who voted for president and vice president.
 
California voted for the Republican incumbent, Dwight D. Eisenhower, in a landslide over the Democratic challenger, former Illinois Governor Adlai Stevenson. However, Stevenson did improve his performance in California from four years previous. California’s result was about 4.3% more Democratic than the nation-at-large.

As of the 2020 presidential election, this is the last presidential election in California where the Republican candidate won the counties of Alameda and San Francisco, both of which have become strongholds of the Democratic Party.

Results

Results by county

References

California
1956
1956 California elections